The Colombo Municipal Council is the municipal governing body of Colombo, the largest city and financial centre in Sri Lanka. It consists of a directly elected executive Mayor of Colombo, current elect is Rosy Senanayake, and 119 elected 119 municipal councilors. The council was formed in 1865, it first met in 1866 and derives most of its powers from Municipal Council Ordinance No. 29 of 1947.

It is the oldest and the largest local government authority in Sri Lanka which covers a resident population of over 600,000 (as of 2001). It is one of the largest employers in the country with over 12,000 employees.

Council
Colombo is a charter city, with a Mayor Council form of government. Colombo's mayor and the council members are elected through local government elections held once in four years. It has 16 standing committees on various subjects.

Officers
The Colombo Municipal Council under the Municipal Council Ordinance have several elected and appointed officers. These are;

Mayor
Deputy Mayor
Municipal Magistrate  
Municipal Commissioner 
Municipal Secretary
Municipal Treasurer
Chief Medical Officer Of Health
Chief Municipal Veterinary Surgeon
Municipal Assessor
Chief Librarian
Charity Commissioner
Chief Fire Officer

Administration
The Mayor serves as the head of the council assisted by a Deputy Mayor. A Municipal Commissioner heads the staff and administration municipal, which is made up of 16 departments. The Municipal Commissioner is appointed by the minister of local government or which ever minister the subject is vested under. Usually the appointment would be made from an officer seconded from the Sri Lanka Administrative Service. In the absence of the mayor or deputy mayor or following the end of term of the council, the commissioner would serve as the officer implementing the powers and functions of the Colombo municipal council. Municipal Commissioner is entitled to use of Park House, Colombo as an official residence which is a 16 bedroom mansion at Albert Crescent, Colombo 7.

Departments
The Colombo municipal council is made up of 16 departments. These include;

 Mayor's Office
 Municipal Treasurer’s Department
 Municipal Secertary’s Department
 Municipal Engineer’s Department
 Municipal Health Department
 Municipal Veterinary Department
 Curative Department
 Indigenous Health Department
 Public Library Department (Colombo Public Library)
 Public Assistance Department
 Legal Department
 Sports and Recreation Department
 Training and Development Department
 Municipal Assessor’s Department 
 Central Procurement Department
 Fire Service Department (Colombo Fire Brigade)

Powers and functions
The municipal council is responsible for:
Urban planning, architectural designs
Sanitation (waste, sewage)
Health and environmental issues
Emergency services (not policing, which is the responsibility of the central government)
Social service
Road management

Population
The Colombo Municipal Council covers the Colombo and Thimbirigasyaya Divisional Secretariat Divisions.  According to the 2011-12 Census the population living within the boundaries of the CMC was 555,031.  Of this number, 318,048 lived in the Colombo DSD (the Northern part of the city) and 236,983 lived in the Thimbirigasyaya DSD (the Southern part).

Political make up
For the past 50 years the city had been dominated by the United National Party (UNP), a right leaning party, whose business friendly policies resonate with the population of Colombo. The UNP as held majority in the council and post of Mayor since the party was formed in 1947, with two brief exceptions. In 1954, the UNP lost the municipal election to the Trotskyist Lanka Sama Samaja Party (LSSP) and Dr N. M. Perera was elected Mayor. The LSSP won several local government elections that year including nine Village Councils and three Urban Councils, apart from the Colombo Municipal Council. In 2006, the UNP nomination list for the 2006 Municipal elections was rejected, and an Independent Group supported by the UNP won the elections. Uvais Mohamed Imitiyas was subsequently appointed Mayor of Colombo. The current Mayoress Rosy Senanayake, the first female Mayor of Colombo, was elected in 2018 representing the UNP.

National politics
Colombo as the largest city and former capital of Sri Lanka, has been at the center of Sri Lankan politics. The Colombo municipal council has been an entry route for many politicians. Four national leaders, which includes two presidents, J. R. Jayewardene and Ranasinghe Premadasa; one prime minister S. W. R. D. Bandaranaike, and an independence activist Vivienne Goonewardene started their political career by contesting for the Colombo municipal council.

See also
Local government in Sri Lanka

References

External links 
Colombo Municipal Council

 
1866 establishments in Ceylon
Local authorities in Western Province, Sri Lanka
Municipal councils of Sri Lanka